Uralba is a rural locality located on the Far North Coast of New South Wales (in Australia).  Its name means "place of plenteous quartz stones".

Administratively it is part of the Ballina Shire.

Demographics 
It had a population 216 in 69 families.
The median age was 54 years.
Most people living in Teven were born in Australia (84%).

Economy 

There were 99 people employed in 2016, and 10 people unemployed.  The most common occupations were Professionals (30%); Managers (15%); Community and Personal Service Workers (11%); Sales Workers (11%) and Labourers(11%).  The top 5 industries for employment were 
Fruit and Tree Nut Growing (9%),
Local Government Administration (9%),
Other Allied Health Services (7%),
Road and Bridge Construction (5%) and
Site Preparation Services (5%).

Housing 
The median rent was $225 per week. This equated to just over 15% of median household income.
The average household size was 2.5 persons.

Environment 

Uralba Nature Reserve, a  nature reserve was gazetted as a State Forest in 1910 and as a nature reserve in 1975.

See also 
 HMAS Uralba was an auxiliary minefield tender and armament stores carrier operated by the Royal Australian Navy (RAN) during World War II.

References 

Towns in New South Wales
Northern Rivers
Ballina Shire